Luiz Mattar (born August 18, 1963) is a former professional tennis player from Brazil.

He played on the professional tour from 1985–1995, during which time he won seven top-level singles titles and five tour doubles titles. Mattar's career-high rankings were World No. 29 in singles (in 1989) and World No. 55 in doubles (in 1991). His career prize money totalled $1,493,136.

With seven ATP singles titles in tournaments of the Association of Professional Tennis Players, he is the second Brazilian tennis player, after Gustavo Kuerten, with more ATP titles in his career. He also led the Brazilian Davis Cup team to their best result in history back in 1992 defeating Germany and Italy and reaching the semi-final of the World Group in the 1992 Davis Cup. This feat has only been matched by Gustavo Kuerten who led the Brazilian team again to the semi-final in 2000.

He started his professional career only at the age of 22, unlike most tennis players who started their careers at 18 or earlier, after dropping out in his last year of engineering at Mackenzie Presbyterian University in São Paulo.

He was trained by Paulo Cleto from the beginning to the end of his career. He even said that he couldn't see himself training with another coach. He is considered by several sports analysts, tennis critics and former tennis players as one of the ten greatest Brazilian tennis players of the Open Era.

Mattar is the son of textile businessman Fuad Mattar and is of Lebanese descent. After retiring from tennis he became an entrepreneur and is the founder of TIVIT, one of Brazil's largest information technology service providers.

Career finals

Singles (7 wins, 4 losses)

Doubles (5 wins, 6 losses)

References

External links
 
 
 

Brazilian male tennis players
Olympic tennis players of Brazil
Tennis players from São Paulo
Brazilian people of Lebanese descent
Tennis players at the 1988 Summer Olympics
Tennis players at the 1992 Summer Olympics
1963 births
Living people
Sportspeople of Lebanese descent